DNA dC->dU-editing enzyme APOBEC-3C is a protein that in humans is encoded by the APOBEC3C gene.

A3C belong to the A3 family of cytidine deaminases that act as restriction factors against diverse retroviruses. A3C was reported to inhibit simian immunodeficiency deficiency virus potently rather than HIV-1, in absence of viral infectivity factor, Vif. Enhancing A3C's catalytic activity had only a marginal effect on HIV-1 replication (in absence of Vif), the counteractive viral mechanism is unclear. A3C was also shown to inhibit other viruses.

Function 

This gene is a member of the cytidine deaminase gene family. It is one of seven related genes or pseudogenes found in a cluster thought to result from gene duplication, on chromosome 22. Members of the cluster encode proteins that are structurally and functionally related to the C to U RNA-editing cytidine deaminase APOBEC1. Conversely, A3 proteins enzymatically convert cytidine to uridine present in the single stranded DNA. Two residues in loop 1 of A3C were demonstrated to determine its antiviral activity against HIV-1.

Structure 
The crystal structure of A3C suggests a putative HIV-1 vif binding region. A3C was found to inhibit LINE-1 elements by directly interacting with ORF1p proteins, in a deaminase-independent manner.

References

Further reading

External links 
 
 

EC 3.5.4